Agustin Mauro Gauto (born 31 December 1997) is an Argentinian professional boxer who held the WBO International light-flyweight title in 2019. As of December 2021, he is ranked as the world's eighth best active mini-flyweight by The Ring.

Professional boxing career
Gauto made his professional debut against Mauro Ezequiel Quinteros on September 16, 2017, and won the fight by unanimous decision. He amassed a 7-0 record before being scheduled to fight for his first title, the vacant South American light flyweight title, against Nohel Arambulet on June 8, 2018. Arambulet retired from the bout at the end of the eight round. Gauto was scheduled to make his first title defense against Luis Golindano on September 1, 2018. He won the fight by a third-round knockout.

Gauto was scheduled to fight Jose Antonio Jimenez for the vacant WBO Latino light-flyweight title on October 31, 2018. He won the fight by a first-round technical knockout.

Gauto fought Jesus Cervantes Villanueva for the vacant IBF Youth light-flyweight title on April 6, 2019. He won the fight by a first-round knockout. Gauto was scheduled to defend his newly acquired title just three weeks later, on April 27, 2019, against Mauro Nicolas Liendro. He beat Liendro by a sixth-round knockout.

Gauto was scheduled to fight Jorge Luis Orozco for the vacant WBO International light-flyweight title on September 28, 2019. He won the fight by unanimous decision. Gauto made the first defense of his WBO International title against Kenny Cano on November 16, 2019, two months after winning it. He won the fight by a second-round knockout.

Gauto made the second defense of his WBO International light-flyweight title against Julio Mendoza on February 29, 2020. He won the fight by a second-round knockout. Gauto was next scheduled to face Juan Jose Jurado on December 12, 2020, in a 117 lbs catchweight bout. He won the fight by a first-round technical knockout.

Gauto was scheduled to face David Barreto on November 13, 2021, in his first fight outside of the American continents, as the bout was scheduled to take place in Duesseldorf, Germany. Barreto later withdrew from the fight due to a positive COVID-19 test, and was replaced by Jaba Memishishi. Gauto made quick work of Memishishi, stopping him by technical knockout in the first round. Gauto was next booked to face Miel Fajardo on March 5, 2022. The event was eventually postponed to 26 March. He lost the fight by a second-round knockout. It was the first loss of his professional career.

Professional boxing record

References

1997 births
Living people
Light-flyweight boxers
Sportspeople from Lanús
Argentine male boxers